Abraham Yachini (Heb: אברהם יכיני ; also transliterated as Abraham Yakhini, or Abraham ha-Yakini; 1611-1682) was one of the chief agitators in the Sabbatean movement, the son of Pethahiah of Constantinople.

Life 
He studied under Joseph Trani of Constantinople (died 1644), and under Mordecai, a German kabbalist. From the latter he probably derived the touch of mysticism which, combined with cunning and great intelligence, made him the most suitable representative of Sabbatai Zevi. Yachini persuaded Sabbatai Zevi, who at that time was convinced that he was the Messiah, but was timid and fearful of proclaiming himself, boldly to declare his claims. It was in Constantinople, about 1653, that Sabbatai Zevi became acquainted with Yachini, who, on account of his learning and oratorical powers, enjoyed a great reputation in his native town. He is described by contemporaries as the best preacher of his day.

Yachini is said by some to have put into the hands of Sabbatai Zevi a spurious book in archaic characters, which, he assured him, contained the Scriptural proof of his Messianic origin. This fabrication, entitled The Great Wisdom of Solomon, began as follows:

In this manner, and in a style imitating the ancient apocalypses, this fabrication, attributed by some scholars to Yachini, who was a master of Hebrew diction, continues to describe the vision which had appeared to the fictitious Abraham. (Other scholars attribute the letter to Nathan of Gaza.) Sabbatai Zevi accepted this work as an actual revelation and determined to go to Thessaloniki—the paradise of kabbalists—and there begin his public activity. Zevi was not ungrateful, and later appointed Yachini among the kings whom he purposed to enthrone over his prospective worldwide empire.

Yachini on his side proved himself not unworthy of the confidence shown by his master. He gave proof of his devotion at the time when Sabbatai Zevi was in prison in Constantinople, and when even the greatest enthusiast could no longer be in doubt concerning his true character. He forged official opinions of the rabbinical council of Constantinople in favor of Sabbatai's claims to Messiahship. With great subtlety he obtained influence over two Polish rabbis who, as delegates of the Jews of eastern Europe, had come to Constantinople in order to investigate the claims of Sabbatai, and exercised such influence over them as to lead them to declare themselves his adherents. The conversion of Sabbatai to Islam put an end to the career of Yachini as an agitator.

Works
Notwithstanding his activity in this direction, he found time for literary work, which is of such merit that, had it not been for the deceptions he practised, it would have secured him an honorable place among the Jewish scholars of his time. He is the author of one hundred and fifty psalms (composed in imitation of those in the Bible), which appeared under the title Hod Malkut (Glory of the Kingdom), Constantinople, 1655. He also wrote Eshel Abraham (Abraham's Oak), a collection of sermons, and Tosefet Merubbah (Additions to Additions), a commentary upon the Tosefta, and responsa. At the request of the Dutch scholar and bibliophile Levinus Warner, whom he knew personally and for whom he copied many Karaite Jewish manuscripts, he composed a work on the genealogy of the patriarch Abraham, which is still preserved in the Warner collection at Leiden. From a Hebrew letter of Yachini to Warner it is learned that the former was in favor with the Dutch minister at the Turkish court, and it must be stated to the credit of Yachini that he used his influence in behalf of strangers.

Among the Krymchaks (Crimean Jews), Yachini is still a name to conjure with. At their prayers in memory of Israel's great dead, his name is mentioned with special solemnity.

Jewish Encyclopedia bibliography
Moritz Steinschneider, Cat. Bodl. No. 4240;
idem, Leyden Catalogue, p. 290;
Julius Fürst, Gesch. d. Karäert. iii. 53;
Anmerkungen, p. 92;
Heinrich Grätz, Gesch. d. Juden, 3d ed., x. 191, 211, 217;
D. Kahana, Eben ha-To'im, pp. 6, 29, 37;
Azulai, Shem ha-Gedolim he-Ḥadash, letter Aleph, No. 58;
Deinard, Massa Krim, ii. 159.

Notes

1611 births
1682 deaths
Fraudsters
Writers from Istanbul
Sabbateans
Jews and Judaism in Istanbul